Koumbia is a department or commune of Tuy Province (Hauts-Bassins Region) in southwestern Burkina Faso. Its capital lies at the town of Koumbia.

Towns and villages

References

Departments of Burkina Faso
Tuy Province